The Snooker Legends was created in 2009 by Jason Francis at Premier Stage Productions to stage events for retired and current snooker players to play exhibition matches once again in some of snooker's most iconic venues. In 2017, Snooker Legends promoted and held its first professional event the 2017 World Seniors Championship. Later in 2017 they created the World Seniors Tour for players aged 40 and above. This tour consisted of four non-ranking events in the 2017/2018 season. They introduced an invitational event in the 2021/2022 season. In early 2022 The 'Merseyside Masters' was staged in Liverpool.

History

2010
The first event was 8 April 2010 and saw Jimmy White, Cliff Thorburn, John Parrott, John Virgo, Michaela Tabb and Alex Higgins return to the Crucible Theatre in Sheffield.  The event is best remembered as the last time Alex Higgins played snooker as he died in July that year.  Alex was replaced by Dennis Taylor and the tour also featured guest appearances by Ray Reardon, Tony Knowles and Ken Doherty.  The highlight of the tour was a maximum 147 break in Redhill by Jimmy White.

2011
In 2011, a further 30 events were held and Ronnie O'Sullivan, Kirk Stevens, Doug Mountjoy, Tony Drago joined the team.  In Dundalk Jimmy White again had a maximum break, however this was from the break off without his opponent ever having a shot.

2012
In 2012, events saw Steve Davis and Stephen Hendry join the team.  'The Legends Cup' was staged in Bedworth where a team from England and Northern Ireland beat a team from The Rest of the World 18–16.

In 2012 Snooker Legends staged a series of 7 events between Ronnie O'Sullivan and Jimmy White. In the first match in Croydon Ronnie made a maximum 147 break, the 3rd perfect break since the tour began.

2013
In 2013, there were 12 events held on the Snooker Legends tour. This included the Legends Cup which was again staged in Bedworth on 10–12 May, and coverage was broadcast live on Eurosport. The teams were England and Northern Ireland vs The Rest of the World, with Dennis Taylor and Cliff Thorburn as respective captains. The Rest of the World won 18–14.

Other events in the same year included the additions of Mark Williams and Joe Johnson to the tour. The format was changed to include doubles matches as well as the single matches, and also involved a colour clearance time challenge in which two teams of doubles cleared only the colours as quickly as they could alternating shots. The exhibitions also gave members of the audience a chance to play a doubles match with the professional players.

2014
The tour started off with visits to Guildford where Chelsea Footballer John Terry played and also Southend, Watford and Durham. In April the legends went back to the crucible with the addition of Joe Johnson and Tony Knowles and then in May moved onto Ipswich and Hamm in Germany. A snookerlegends app was created to show live streaming with the 2014 legends cup shown on pay per view in the app. The Legends Cup saw debuts for 10 times world champion Reanne Evans.

In July 2014 the first snooker legends pro am series was held. This was a competition to allow amateur players to challenge some of the best professionals in the world, receiving a 21 handicap start. The competition as attended by 70 amateurs and won by Daniel Wells who carried off £1200 for beating professional Ben Woollaston 4–3 in the final.

2015–2016
More exhibitions were held with the doubles event in Watford being won by Cliff Thorburn and Tony Drago. Also the Snooker Legends Book was published. Ronnie O'Sullivan made 147 breaks in Scunthorpe, Copenhagen, Leicester and Newry.

World Seniors Championship 2017
In 2017, Snooker Legends organised the World Seniors Championship for the first time. It had previously been a WPBSA sanctioned event. This paved the way for the creation of the World Seniors Tour the following season.

World Seniors Tour 2017/2018
In 2017 Snooker Legends created the World Seniors Tour for players aged 40 and above. This tour consisted of a series of 4 non-ranking events in the 2017/2018 season: the UK Seniors Championship, the Seniors Irish Masters, The Seniors Masters and the World Seniors Championship.

Snooker Legends 2021/2022
Snooker Legends staged its first invitational event in four seasons in February 2022. This was in part due to the fact that the World Seniors Tour was only staging two events in the 2021/2022 season. Ronnie O'Sullivan won the Merseyside Masters beating Jimmy White 6–5 in the final.

References

External links 
 
 https://www.facebook.com/SnookerLegends

Snooker competitions in the United Kingdom
Snooker amateur competitions
Sports organizations established in 2009
2009 establishments in the United Kingdom